Dromica is a genus of beetles in the family Cicindelidae, containing the following species:

References

 
Cicindelidae